Jayayakshya Malla (often named  Yaksha Malla for short) was the son of Jayajyotir Malla and the last Malla king of the united Kathmandu Valley from around 1428 until his death in 1482. The valley was divided among his sons after his death.

Construction works
He encircled Khowpa Bhaktapur city with moats and defense walls pierced with defense gates and ordered the construction of The Palace of Fifty-five Windows (Bhaktapur's Royal Palace). The palace would later be remodelled by Bhupatindra Malla in the seventeenth century

He constructed the Pashupatinath Temple, a replica of the temple by the Bagmati River in Yein Kathmandu and the Siddha Pokhari, a large rectangular water tank located near the main city gate of Khowpa Bhaktapur. He is also credited as the founder of Yaksheswar Temple now standing in the palace complex.

Conquests and treaties
Early in his reign, he raided south into Mithila, into the State of Bihar and as far as Bengal.  He consolidated control over the trade route to Tibet and captured the Tibetan stronghold of Shelkar Dzong. As a result of his conquests, the boundary of Nepal extended as far as Sikkim in the east, Kerung in the North, Gorkha in the west, and Bihar in the south.

After his death in 1482, he was succeeded in Bhaktapur by his son, Raya Malla, and in Kantipur by his son Ratna Malla.

References

Malla rulers of the Kathmandu Valley
People from Bhaktapur
15th-century Nepalese people
Nepalese Hindus

Nepalese monarchs
1408 births
1482 deaths
History of Nepal